People's Reporter (A forum of current affairs) (established in 1988) is a semi-monthly newspaper published from Mumbai, especially on events covering Ecumenism and Interfaith dialogue, both nationally and internationally.  

Though the newspaper is available in print edition, it is also made available in pdf format through many other web sites which host it, namely, SlideShare, Dockoc, Academia.edu, Jaffna Diocese of the Church of South India, the National Council of Churches in India, Radicalizing reformation. and the Social Sciences Institute of the Evangelical Church in Germany.

References 

Semi-monthly newspapers
English-language newspapers published in India
Mass media in Mumbai
Newspapers published in Mumbai
1988 establishments in Maharashtra
Publications established in 1988